The  is a subway line in Tokyo, Japan, owned and operated by Tokyo Metro.

Overview
The  line serves the wards of Shibuya, Minato, Chiyoda, Chūō, Kōtō, and Sumida. Despite being shorter in length than nearly all other Tokyo subway lines, the Hanzōmon Line operates some of the longest through services with private railways – namely Tōkyū Corporation and Tobu Railway.

The Hanzōmon Line has direct interchanges with all other Tokyo Metro and Toei lines. It connects with the Tokyo Metro Ginza Line at five stations (the four stations between Shibuya and Nagatachō, as well as at Mitsukoshimae Station.

The line is named after the west gate of the Imperial Palace (Hanzōmon), which in turn is named after 16th century samurai Hattori Hanzō, who was important to the founding of the shogunate which built the palace. The Hanzōmon Line's color on maps and station guides is purple, and stations carry the prefix "Z" followed by a number.

According to the Tokyo Metropolitan Bureau of Transportation, as of June 2009 the Hanzōmon Line is the sixth most crowded subway line in Tokyo, at its peak running at 173% capacity between Shibuya and Omotesandō stations.

Station list

 All stations are located in Tokyo.
 All services stop at every station.

Rolling stock

Current
 Tokyo Metro 18000 series
 Tokyo Metro 08 series
 Tokyo Metro 8000 series
 Tokyu 2020 series
 Tokyu 5000 series
 Tobu 50000 series
 Tobu 50050 series

Former
 Tobu 30000 series
 Tokyu 2000 series
 Tokyu 8500 series
 Tokyu 8590 series

History
The Hanzōmon Line was first planned in 1971, along with the Chiyoda Line and Yūrakuchō Line, as a reliever line for the heavily congested Ginza Line. Its initial routing was from Futako-Tamagawa Station on the Tōkyū Den-en-toshi Line to a new station in the Fukagawa district of Kōtō. In 1985, a second draft plan from the Ministry of Transportation moved the Hanzōmon Line's final terminus to Matsudo. During the planning stage, it was known as Line 11.

Construction began in 1972 and the majority of the line was expected to open in 1975. However, the Teito Rapid Transit Authority did not have enough funds to build the line, which delayed its construction. On August 1, 1978, the first section of the Hanzōmon Line finally opened from Shibuya to Aoyama-itchōme, including through services with the Den-en-toshi Line. It was then extended to Nagatachō Station in September 1979.

However, the next extension posed political problems, as the original plan had the line run directly under the Imperial Palace to Ōtemachi Station. TRTA decided to divert the route around the north side of the Imperial Palace, which required the construction of three new stations. An eminent domain battle erupted with landowners along the proposed route, which delayed the completion of the next stage of the line. Hanzomon Station opened in December 1982, and the full extension around the Imperial Palace, terminating at Mitsukoshi-mae, was not completed until January 1989. The line was then extended to Suitengu-mae in November 1990 and finally Oshiage in March 2003, the latter also enabling through service with the Tobu Skytree Line.

The line, station facilities, rolling stock, and related assets were inherited by Tokyo Metro after the privatization of the Teito Rapid Transit Authority (TRTA) in 2004.

The Ministry of Transportation recommended in 2000 that the line be extended to Matsudo by 2015. However, Tokyo Metro stated in its initial public offering that its construction operations would cease once the Fukutoshin Line is completed, which casts some doubt as to whether the Matsudo extension will actually be built.

Notes 

a. Crowding levels defined by the Ministry of Land, Infrastructure, Transport and Tourism:

100% — Commuters have enough personal space and are able to take a seat or stand while holding onto the straps or hand rails.
150% — Commuters have enough personal space to read a newspaper.
180% — Commuters must fold newspapers to read.
200% — Commuters are pressed against each other in each compartment but can still read small magazines.
250% — Commuters are pressed against each other, unable to move.

References

External links
 Tokyo Metro website 

Lines of Tokyo Metro
Railway lines in Tokyo
1067 mm gauge railways in Japan
Railway lines opened in 1978
1978 establishments in Japan